Nestor Bolum (born 19 September 1986) is a Nigerian professional boxer. As an amateur, he participated in the 2004 Summer Olympics for his native West African country.

Career
In 2003 southpaw Bolum who works for the Nigerian Air Force won the silver medal at the All-Africa Games in Abuja, Nigeria.

At the Olympics he was defeated in the quarterfinals of the bantamweight (54 kg) division by Thailand's eventual runner-up Worapoj Petchkoom.

At the Commonwealth Games he was edged out by eventual winner Akhil Kumar in the semifinal.

On the 7th of November, Bolum announced to the Guardian that he is returning to the boxing ring to face Luke Martin

Professional boxing record

References

External links
 
Bio

1986 births
Boxers at the 2004 Summer Olympics
Living people
Olympic boxers of Nigeria
Bantamweight boxers
Commonwealth Games bronze medallists for Nigeria
Boxers at the 2006 Commonwealth Games
Nigerian Air Force personnel
Nigerian male boxers
Commonwealth Games medallists in boxing
African Games silver medalists for Nigeria
African Games medalists in boxing
Competitors at the 2003 All-Africa Games
Southpaw boxers
Super-bantamweight boxers
Lightweight boxers
Medallists at the 2006 Commonwealth Games